Pterostylis boormanii, commonly known as the Sikh's whiskers, baggy britches, or Boorroans green-hood is a plant in the orchid family Orchidaceae and is endemic to south-eastern Australia. It has a rosette of leaves and up to seven dark reddish-brown flowers with translucent "windows" and a thick, brown, bristly, insect-like labellum.

Description
Pterostylis boormanii, is a terrestrial,  perennial, deciduous, herb with an underground tuber. The leaves are usually withered by flowering time. Two to five stem leaves are wrapped around the flowering spike. Flowering occurs from September to November.

Taxonomy and naming
Pterostylis boormanii was first formally described in 1944 by Herman Rupp from a specimen collected near Peak Hill and the description was published in his book Orchids of New South Wales. The specific epithet (boormanii) honours the collector of the type specimen, John Boorman.

Distribution and habitat
Sikh's whiskers grows in drier forest and scrub, often in rocky places and in association with Callitris species.

References

boormanii
Endemic orchids of Australia
Orchids of New South Wales
Orchids of South Australia
Orchids of Victoria (Australia)
Plants described in 1944
Taxa named by Herman Rupp